Corallocarpus elegans is a species of plants in the family Cucurbitaceae. It is found in Africa.

References

External links
 Corallocarpus elegans at Tropicos

Cucurbitoideae
Plants described in 1904